Karla Šašková (born 29 June 1943) is a Czech volleyball player. She competed in the women's tournament at the 1968 Summer Olympics.

References

1943 births
Living people
Czech women's volleyball players
Olympic volleyball players of Czechoslovakia
Volleyball players at the 1968 Summer Olympics
Sportspeople from Prague